The women's 200 metres event at the 1999 Summer Universiade was held on 8, 9 and 10 July at the Estadio Son Moix in Palma de Mallorca, Spain.

Medalists

Results

Heats
Wind:Heat 1: -2.0 m/s, Heat 2: -3.5 m/s, Heat 3: -2.1 m/s, Heat 4: ? m/s, Heat 5: -1.6 m/s, Heat 6: +0.5 m/s

Quarterfinals
Wind:Heat 1: +0.2 m/s, Heat 2: +0.6 m/s, Heat 3: +2.3 m/s, Heat 4: +1.6 m/s, Heat 5: +1.5 m/s

Semifinals
Wind:Heat 1: -1.3 m/s, Heat 2: -1.0 m/s

Final
Wind: -1.1 m/s

References

Athletics at the 1999 Summer Universiade
1999 in women's athletics
1999